Computer Task Group, Inc (commonly referred to as CTG) is an American multinational company headquartered in Buffalo, New York, that provides information technology staffing.

History
CTG was founded in 1966 by Randolph A. Marks and G. David Baer, two former employees of IBM, in Buffalo, New York. It was then called Marks-Baer Inc. (MBI). MBI's initial market was the medical industry, since both founders had experience in that area. By 1968, staff had grown to 20 and Marks-Baer Inc. changed its name to Computer Task Group Inc. (CTG). The company went public in 1969.

In 1975, CTG decided to become a national company. CTG accelerated growth through acquisitions beginning in 1980 and within 5 years, acquired 15 companies. In 1986, the company made its first international acquisition, Shubrook International, Ltd., a software consulting firm based in Chertsey, England.

In 2013, CTG acquired etrinity N.V., a healthcare IT company in Belgium.

In 2018, CTG acquired Soft Company, a consulting and digital services company headquartered in Paris, France.

Acquisitions

 Diversified Systems Inc. (1983)
 Automated Business Systems, Inc. (1983)
 Berger, Vernay & Co. (1985)
 Delta Force Inc. (1985)
 Documentation Resources, Inc. (1986)
 Shubrooks International, Ltd. (1986)
 Applied Management Systems, Inc. (1988)
 Connolly Data Systems Inc. (1990)
 Telecommunications Management Consultants (1990)
 Rendeck International N.V. (1990)
 Elumen Solutions Inc. (1999)
 etrinity N.V. (2013)
 Soft Company (2018)
 Tech-IT (2019)

Divestitures

 Profimatics Inc. (1994)

Services
CTG develops IT for companies in several industries including healthcare and technology services, and provides managed services IT staffing for technology companies and large corporations. The company concentrates on the financial services, telecommunications, government, industry, life sciences, and healthcare sectors. The scope of offered services includes development and integration, application management, information security, system and process assessment, and IT consulting.

CTG Belgium created a software testing methodology called FASTBoX (Framework for Automated Software Testing Based On eXperience).

Operations
CTG operates in North America (US and Canada), Western Europe (Belgium, Luxembourg, United Kingdom and France), and India. It counts about 451 clients; its largest clients are IBM and SDI International. As of December 2019, the company employs approximately 3,950 people worldwide, with 2,650 in the United States and Canada and 1,300 in Europe.

In 2018, the company operated 9 subsidiaries:

 Computer Task Group of Canada, Inc.
 Computer Task Group Belgium N.V.
 CTG ITS S.A.
 Computer Task Group IT Solutions, S.A.
 Computer Task Group Luxembourg PSF
 Computer Task Group (U.K.) Ltd.
 CTG Health Solutions N.V.
 Soft Company SAS (“Soft Company”)
 Computer Task Information Technology Private Services Limited

References

External links 

International information technology consulting firms
Companies based in Buffalo, New York
Business services companies established in 1966
Companies listed on the Nasdaq
1966 establishments in New York (state)